SCAC may refer to:

 Slim Cessna's Auto Club, alternative country band
 South Central Athletic Conference, an intercollegiate athletic conference of historically black colleges and universities in the United States (1935–1961)
 Southern Collegiate Athletic Conference, athletic conference in NCAA Division III
 Standard Carrier Alpha Codes, four-letter transportation carrier codes
 Sukhoi Civil Aircraft Corporation, Russian aircraft manufacturer Sukhoi